Andrei Adistia (born 15 December 1990) is an Indonesian badminton player who specializes in doubles. With his partner Hendra Aprida Gunawan, they have won some international tournaments such as 2014 Vietnam Open Grand Prix and 2014 Chinese Taipei Open Grand Prix Gold.

Personal life 
Adistia married a former national badminton player from PB Djarum Maria Febe Kusumastuti on 27 October 2017.

Achievements

BWF Grand Prix (2 titles, 2 runners-up) 
The BWF Grand Prix had two levels, the BWF Grand Prix and Grand Prix Gold. It was a series of badminton tournaments sanctioned by the Badminton World Federation (BWF) which was held from 2007 to 2017.

Men's doubles

Mixed doubles

  Grand Prix Gold Tournament
  Grand Prix Tournament

BWF International Challenge/Series (1 title, 2 runners-up) 
Men's doubles

  BWF International Challenge tournament
  BWF International Series tournament

Performance timeline

Individual competitions 
 Senior level

References

External links 
 

1990 births
Living people
Sportspeople from Jakarta
Indonesian male badminton players
21st-century Indonesian people